In mathematics, and especially differential geometry and algebraic geometry, a stable principal bundle is a generalisation of the notion of a stable vector bundle to the setting of principal bundles. The concept of stability for principal bundles was introduced by Annamalai Ramanathan for the purpose of defining the moduli space of G-principal bundles over a Riemann surface, a generalisation of earlier work by David Mumford and others on the moduli spaces of vector bundles.

Many statements about the stability of vector bundles can be translated into the language of stable principal bundles. For example, the analogue of the Kobayashi–Hitchin correspondence for principal bundles, that a holomorphic principal bundle over a compact Kähler manifold admits a Hermite–Einstein connection if and only if it is polystable, was shown to be true in the case of projective manifolds by Subramanian and Ramanathan, and for arbitrary compact Kähler manifolds by Anchouche and Biswas.

Definition
The essential definition of stability for principal bundles was made by Ramanathan, but applies only to the case of Riemann surfaces. In this section we state the definition as appearing in the work of Anchouche and Biswas which is valid over any Kähler manifold, and indeed makes sense more generally for algebraic varieties. This reduces to Ramanathan's definition in the case the manifold is a Riemann surface.

Let  be a connected reductive algebraic group over the complex numbers . Let  be a compact Kähler manifold of complex dimension . Holomorphic here means that the transition functions for  vary holomorphically, which makes sense as the structure group is a complex Lie group. The principal bundle  is called stable (resp. semi-stable) if for every reduction of structure group  for  a maximal parabolic subgroup where  is some open subset with the codimension , we have 

Recall that the degree of a vector bundle (or coherent sheaf)  is defined to be 

Relation to stability of vector bundles

Given a principal -bundle for a complex Lie group  there are several natural vector bundles one may associate to it. 

The essential point is that a maximal parabolic subgroup  corresponds to a choice of flag , where  is invariant under the subgroup . It can then be computed that

where  denotes the slope of the vector bundles.

The principal bundle  is semistable if and only if the adjoint bundle  is slope semistable, and furthermore if  is stable, then  is slope polystable. Again the key point here is that for a parabolic subgroup , one obtains a parabolic subalgebra  and can take the associated subbundle.

Generalisations

Just as one can generalise a vector bundle to the notion of a Higgs bundle, it is possible to formulate a definition of a principal -Higgs bundle. The above definition of stability for principal bundles generalises to these objects by requiring the reductions of structure group are compatible with the Higgs field of the principal Higgs bundle. It was shown by Anchouche and Biswas that the analogue of the nonabelian Hodge correspondence for Higgs vector bundles is true for principal -Higgs bundles in the case where the base manifold  is a complex projective variety.

References

Fiber bundles
Algebraic geometry
Differential geometry